Massimo Borgobello (born 17 May 1971 in Sacile, Friuli) is a retired Italian footballer. He played as a forward.

He played 6 games in the Serie A in the 1999/00 season for S.S.C. Venezia. In July 2005, he was banned for 5 months due to Caso Genoa.

He was the 3rd best scorer of the Serie B in the 2002/03 season with 18 goals.

External links

1971 births
Living people
People from Sacile
Italian footballers
Serie A players
Serie B players
Novara F.C. players
A.C. ChievoVerona players
Ternana Calcio players
Venezia F.C. players
U.S. Salernitana 1919 players
U.S. Triestina Calcio 1918 players
A.C. Monza players
S.S. Ischia Isolaverde players
Association football forwards
Footballers from Friuli Venezia Giulia